The Polish Women's Cup (Polish: Puchar Polski kobiet) is the national women's football cup competition in Poland and was first held in 1984/85. Up to 2021 KKS Czarni Sosnowiec has won twelve times and is the cup's record champion. They won eight editions in a row from 1994/95 to 2001/02.

List of finals

See also
Polish Cup, men's edition

References

External links
Cup at Polish Football Association
Cup at 90minut.pl

Pol
Women
Recurring sporting events established in 1984
Cup